Chouraqui is a surname. Notable people with the surname include:

 André Chouraqui (1917–2007), Algerian-French lawyer, scholar, and politician 
 Élie Chouraqui (born 1950), French director

Jewish surnames